In theatre, methexis (also methectics), is "group sharing". Originating from Greek theatre, the audience participates, creates and improvises the action of the ritual.

In philosophy, methexis is the relation between a particular and a form (in Plato's sense), e.g. a beautiful object is said to partake of the form of beauty.

Methexis is sometimes contrasted with mimesis. The latter "connotes emphasis on the solo performer (the hero) separate from the audience," in direct contrast to the communal methectic theatrical experience which has "little or no 'fourth wall'".

References

External links

Theatrical genres